Charles Ford served as a member of the 1861-62 California State Assembly, representing the 3rd District.

References

Members of the California State Assembly
Year of birth missing
Year of death missing